The Supplementary Cup was a Scottish football competition open to teams in the B Division, firstly in the Southern League during season 1945–46 and when full peacetime football returned the following season, the Scottish League between seasons 1946–47 and 1951–52. The competition never had a set format apart from a two-legged final when the competition was continued by the Scottish League.

History 

The Supplementary Cup was organised by clubs in the B Division of the Southern League to dovetail the end of the league season in February. The competition was launched to accommodate clubs in the B Division who were faced with the prospect of a minimum 32 game campaign of league and cup fixtures. With crowds of over 15,000 attending matches, it prompted the Scottish League to continue the competition when full peacetime football returned the following season.

The second edition of the competition again proved popular with crowds but the third edition proved difficult to run with trying to find suitable dates to play matches. The 1948–49 and 1949–50 editions saw the B Division clubs run the cup, without the league's organisation, which ended up being a shambles. Contributing factors such as finding suitable dates and waning interest from the public saw the tournament abandoned in 1949–50, which meant no return for the cup the following season. The success of the two Saint Mungo Cup tournaments celebrating the Festival of Britain in 1950–51, saw calls for the cup to be revived, which it did, for the 1951–52 season, which proved to be last edition of the competition to date.

The last known whereabouts of the trophy saw it reside in the boardroom at Shawfield by virtue of Clyde being the last winners of the competition, which could mean that the trophy currently resides in the boardroom at Broadwood, the current home of Clyde.

List of Finals

Southern League B Division

Scottish League B Division

See also 

 Scottish C Division League Cup
 Spring Cup
 Scottish Challenge Cup

References 

Defunct football cup competitions in Scotland
Scottish Football League
Wartime football in Scotland
Recurring sporting events established in 1945
Recurring events disestablished in 1952
1945 establishments in Scotland
1952 disestablishments in Scotland